The 1980 City of Aberdeen Council election took place on 1 May 1980 to elect members of City of Aberdeen Council, as part of that years Scottish local elections.

Election results

References

1980
1980 Scottish local elections
20th century in Aberdeen